Milho Branco is a village in the southeastern part of the island of Santiago, Cape Verde. It is situated 2 km north of Ribeirão Chiqueiro, 5 km east of the city São Domingos and 12 km north of the capital Praia. The national road EN1-ST02 from Ribeirão Chiqueiro to Tarrafal via Pedra Badejo passes through the village. It is part of the municipality of São Domingos. In 2010 its population was 607.

Localities
 Cabeça Horta
 Chã Cardoso
 Chanzinha
 Milho Branco
 Sezimbra
 Terra Branca

References

Villages and settlements in Santiago, Cape Verde
São Domingos Municipality, Cape Verde